Jinnaram is a town and Mandal headquarters in Sangareddy district of Telangana, India.

References

Villages in Medak district